Magomed Abdusalamov (born 25 March 1981) is a Russian former professional boxer who competed from 2008 to 2013. As an amateur he won the 2005 and 2006 Russian national championships in the super-heavyweight division. He turned professional in 2008, fighting nineteen times at heavyweight and winning his first eighteen by knockout. In 2013, Abdusalamov was forced to retire from the sport due to severe brain injuries sustained during his only career defeat.

Early life
Magomed Abdusalamov was born in Dagestan's capital city of Makhachkala on 25 March 1981. He grew up in a strict Muslim household and was his parents' first male child. Growing up in a large family, from an early age his disciplinarian father pushed his son into sports as a way to shelter him from the growing violence and crime in the city.

Amateur career
In spite of his success at the nationals 2005 and 2006, hard-punching southpaw Abdusalamov stood in the shadows of Islam Timurziev, who was regularly sent to international competitions ahead of him.

He did not qualify for the 2008 Olympics after losing to eventual bronze medalist David Price in a qualifier.

Professional career
Abdusalamov turned pro in 2008 and won his first four bouts for Warriors boxing.

Of his nineteen professional fights he got eighteen wins, all by KO or TKO.

In September 2012, he was dropped hard by Jameel McCline in the first round, but won by TKO in the second round to win the vacant World Boxing Council United States Heavyweight title at Olympiyskiy in Moscow, Russia.  He defended the USNBC title twice with stoppage wins in 2013, against Victor Bisbal in Atlantic City, New Jersey in March 2013, and Sebastian Ceballos in Buenos Aires, Argentina in April 2013.

On 2 November 2013, Abdusalamov took on Mike Perez in a 10-round fight for his title at Madison Square Garden in New York City as part of an HBO event featuring Gennady Golovkin in the main event. In a largely one-sided fight, which was scored seven rounds to three on two scorecards, Abdusalamov lost his title as Perez landed a bevy of power punches that the champion managed to withstand despite being cut late in the fight.

Brain injury
Abdusalamov was cleared of brain injury by Barry Jordan, Chief Medical Officer of the New York State Athletic Commission. Immediately afterwards, Abdusalamov took a taxi from Madison Square Garden to Roosevelt Hospital on the Upper West Side. The doctors who examined Abdusalamov found that he had sustained a large blood clot on his brain, in addition to the wear and tear he suffered during the course of the fight. Doctors put Abdusalamov into medically induced coma as a way to give the swelling in his brain time to subside. Shortly after being put into a coma, he suffered a stroke, leading doctors to fear he was going to die. On 6 November 2013, his condition was described as critical but stable.

Abdusalamov's wife, Bakanay Abdusalamova, and their three daughters were with him in hospital.

Doctors briefly awakened Abdusalamov from his medically-induced coma and removed his respirator on the morning of 22 November. He was brought back into medically-induced coma later that day as a precautionary measure after his temperature rose to 103 degrees.

On Monday, 9 December, it was reported that the 32-year-old heavyweight was again out of coma, awake and aware of his surroundings, and that his condition had improved sufficiently to allow him to be moved to a regular room. "They said this is different than last time, because this time he's showing more improvement. He's awake. He's not able to speak, but he's awake and aware of his surroundings even if he can't speak. His eyes are open," said his promoter, Sampson Lewkowicz.

On 19 December 2013, the neurosurgeon attending to Abdusalamov said in his opinion, Abdusalamov's career was over, despite his condition improving. "He's going to get better, I'm confident", Dr. Rupendra Swarup said, "but he will not be the same. He's going to have neurological deficits."

In late May 2014, his wife Bakanay Abdusalamov told BoxingScene.com that Magomed was showing signs of improvement – he could recognize relatives, understand everything they were telling him, and was able to speak in short sentences with a low voice.

Medical bills

With Abdusalamov's family facing "staggering" medical bills from the very start, promoters Lewkowicz, Lou DiBella, Leon Margules, and others called for donations and set up a trust fund. The Abdusalamov family is also accepting donations directly and boxing charity Ring 10 has similarly called for donations.

Lawsuit
In February 2014 it was reported that the family would sue the New York State Athletic Commission seeking $100 million in damages.

On 8 September 2017, New York State agreed to pay $22 million to Abdusalamov and his family following a lawsuit where the issue of assumed risk came to play. This was the largest personal injury award issued by New York State.

Speaking through his wife as his interpreter, Abdusalamov and his attorney, Paul Edelstein, are pushing for federal legislation to improve boxing safety. Currently, boxing regulations are mandated by the particular state in which a fight takes place.  Edelstein has called for one set of rules to protect sport fighters across the United States.

Professional boxing record

References

External links

Russian Championships 2005
Russian Championships 2006

1981 births
Living people
Russian people of Dagestani descent
Russian Muslims
Heavyweight boxers
Super-heavyweight boxers
People with traumatic brain injuries
Russian male boxers
People with severe brain damage
Dargwa people
Sportspeople from Makhachkala